Burao Airport  is an airport in Burao, Somaliland. It is situated less than one kilometre north-east from the New Bridge at the City Center. As of 2012, the airport's facilities are undergoing major renovations, supervised by the ICAO.

See also
 Egal International Airport
 Berbera Airport
 Erigavo Airport
 Borama Airport
 List of airports in Somaliland
 Ministry of Civil Aviation (Somaliland)

References

External links
 
 

Airports in Somaliland